Tamaryn Hendler and Anastasia Pivovarova were the defending champions, but neither player chose to participate.

Quinn Gleason and Luisa Stefani won the tournament, defeating Bárbara Gatica and Rebeca Pereira 6–0, 4–6, [10–7] in the final.

Seeds

Draw

Draw

References
Main Draw

Copa LP Chile Hacienda Chicureo - Doubles